Together is a 1956 film about two deaf people in the East End of London, directed by Lorenza Mazzetti, in collaboration with Denis Horne, based on his short story, "The Glass Marble." The two main characters are played by artists Eduardo Paolozzi and Michael Andrews, who were friends of the filmmaker. The film, produced by the British Film Institute Experimental Film Fund, was first shown as part of the first Free Cinema programme at the National Film Theatre in London in February 1956, along with Tony Richardson and Karel Reisz's Momma Don't Allow, and Lindsay Anderson's O Dreamland.

See also
 List of avant-garde films of the 1950s

References

External links

 

1956 films
1956 drama films
British drama films
British black-and-white films
1950s English-language films
1950s British films